The United States Courthouse in Seattle, Washington, is a federal courthouse and office building used primarily by the United States District Court for the Western District of Washington. When it opened on August 17, 2004, at a cost of $171 million, it replaced the historic William Kenzo Nakamura United States Courthouse, which has since been transferred to the United States Court of Appeals for the Ninth Circuit.

It was designed by NBBJ and Magnusson Klemencic Associates with future expansion in mind and features engineering designed to withstand earthquakes, terrorism, and other possible threats. The General Services Administration awarded two design awards to the building in 2005 for design and construction excellence; it also received a commendation from the Seattle chapter of the American Institute of Architects for "advancing the quality of civic design".

See also
List of United States federal courthouses in Washington

References

External links

United States District Court for the Western District of Washington
GSA profile

Federal courthouses in the United States
Courthouses in Washington (state)
Government buildings completed in 2004
Government buildings in Seattle
NBBJ buildings
Downtown Seattle